Midnight Love is a 1982 album by Marvin Gaye.

Midnight Love may also refer to:

 Midnight Love (TV series), an American music video television series
 "Midnight Love", a 1994 song by Mick Ronson from Heaven and Hull
 "Midnight Love", a 2011 song by Cave Painting from their EP You'll Be Running Soon
 "Midnight Love", a 1991 song by Roxus from the album Nightstreet
 "Midnight Love", a 1989 song by Fifth Angel from the album Time Will Tell
 "Midnight Love", a 1997 song by Snoop Dogg, featuring Daz Dillinger and Raphael Saadiq
 "Midnight Love", a 2020 song by Girl in Red

See also
 Midnight Lover (disambiguation)